Mary Ellen Epps (December 25, 1934 – June 6, 2014) was an American politician who served in the Colorado House of Representatives from the 19th district from 1987 to 1999 and in the Colorado Senate from the 11th district from 1999 to 2003.

She died on June 6, 2014, in Colorado Springs, Colorado at age 79.

References

1934 births
2014 deaths
Republican Party members of the Colorado House of Representatives
Republican Party Colorado state senators